The Saxon Class IX  was a class of German, eight-coupled, tender locomotives built for the Royal Saxon State Railways (Königlich Sächsische Staatseisenbahnen) for goods train duties.

History 
These steam locomotives were brought into service, after it was clear that the Saxon Class I V (later DRG Class 55) could no longer the demands placed on it. The locomotive had a hollow, Klien-Lindner axle at the back and, initially, a long steam collection pipe above the centre of the boiler which was replaced on later models by two steam domes and a connecting pipe. Twenty machines were delivered by the firm of Hartmann as wet steam engines, a further 30 with a Schmidt smoke tube superheater.

The Deutsche Reichsbahn took over 16 of the first series and gave them the running numbers 56 501–56 516. Of the second batch, 25 were taken on with numbers 56 601–56 625.

The vehicle were coupled with tenders of Saxon classes sä 3 T 9, sä 3 T 12 or sä 3 T 13.

See also
Royal Saxon State Railways
List of Saxon locomotives and railbuses

References

2-8-0 locomotives
09 V
Sächsische Maschinenfabrik locomotives
1′D n2v locomotives

Freight locomotives